Estádio Nacional 24 de Setembro is a multi-purpose stadium in Bissau, Guinea Bissau.  The stadium opened its doors in 1989. It is currently used primarily for football matches, and the stadium holds 20,000 people. It is currently the home ground of the Guinea-Bissau national football team.

Usage
Football (soccer) clubs compete in the stadium including the city's chief teams of Benfica Bissau and Sporting Bissau which are also the country's popular teams.  Other clubs playing at the stadium includes Inter Bissau and Portos de Bissau. Athletics is also used in the stadium.

References

External links
Cafe.daum.net/stade: Guinea-Bissau

World Stadiums: Guinea-Bissau 

Football venues in Guinea-Bissau
Athletics (track and field) venues in Guinea-Bissau
Guinea-Bissau
Multi-purpose stadiums
Buildings and structures in Bissau
Sports venues completed in 1989